Morse Cobblestone Farmhouse is a historic home and farm complex located at Wilson in Niagara County, New York.  It was constructed between about 1840 and 1845.  It is an L-shaped cobblestone building with a 2-story, three-bay-wide main block and -story, four-bay side block and rear kitchen block in the Greek Revival style.  It has a porch along the side wing added about 1910.  It features irregularly shaped, variously colored cobbles in its construction. It is one of approximately 47 cobblestone structures in Niagara County.  Also on the property are two fieldstone barns.

It was listed on the National Register of Historic Places in 2010.

References

Houses on the National Register of Historic Places in New York (state)
Houses completed in 1845
Greek Revival houses in New York (state)
Cobblestone architecture
Houses in Niagara County, New York
National Register of Historic Places in Niagara County, New York